Alan Rushby (born 27 December 1933) is an English former professional footballer who played in the Football League for Bradford Park Avenue, Doncaster Rovers and Mansfield Town.

References

1933 births
Living people
English footballers
Association football defenders
English Football League players
Doncaster Rovers F.C. players
Mansfield Town F.C. players
Bradford (Park Avenue) A.F.C. players